The 2001–02 Ohio State Buckeyes men's basketball finished in a four-way tie atop the Big Ten regular season standings, and followed that by winning the Big Ten tournament for the first time. The Buckeyes received an automatic bid to the NCAA tournament as No. 4 seed in the West region. After an opening round victory over No. 13 seed , they lost to No. 12 seed Missouri in the second round. The Buckeyes finished with a record of 24–8 (11–5 Big Ten), but all 32 games – including the Big Ten regular season and tournament titles, and NCAA Tournament appearance – were later vacated due to NCAA sanctions.

Roster

Schedule and results

|-
!colspan=9 style=| Regular season

|-
!colspan=9 style=| Big Ten tournament

|-
!colspan=9 style=| NCAA Tournament

Rankings

References

Ohio State
Ohio State Buckeyes men's basketball seasons
Ohio State
Ohio State Buckeyes
Ohio State Buckeyes